Hermann Mazurkiewitsch (born 12 October 1925) was an Austrian boxer. He competed in the men's bantamweight event at the 1948 Summer Olympics.

References

External links
  

1925 births
Possibly living people
Austrian male boxers
Olympic boxers of Austria
Boxers at the 1948 Summer Olympics
Place of birth missing
Bantamweight boxers
20th-century Austrian people